Artyomovsk is a town in Kuraginsky District of Krasnoyarsk Krai, Russia, located  south of Krasnoyarsk. Population:

History
It was founded in 1860 as a mining settlement of Olkhovsky. It was granted town status in 1939.

Administrative and municipal status
Within the framework of administrative divisions, it is, together with the settlement of Dzheb, incorporated within Kuraginsky District as the district town of Artyomovsk. As a municipal division, the district town of Artyomovsk is incorporated within Kuraginsky Municipal District as Artyomovsk Urban Settlement.

References

Notes

Sources

External links
Official website of Artyomovsk 
Directory of organizations in Artyomovsk 

Cities and towns in Krasnoyarsk Krai
Kuraginsky District